Maksymilian Banaszewski (born 22 March 1995) is a Polish professional footballer who plays as a winger for Zagłębie Sosnowiec.

References

External links

Living people
1995 births
Association football midfielders
Polish footballers
Hutnik Warsaw players
Znicz Pruszków players
Stal Mielec players
Arka Gdynia players
Chrobry Głogów players
Zagłębie Sosnowiec players
II liga players
I liga players
Ekstraklasa players
Footballers from Warsaw